Sára Čajanová (born 10 December 2002) is a Czech ice hockey player and member of the Czech national ice hockey team,  playing in the Swedish Women's Hockey League (SDHL) with Brynäs IF Dam.

Čajanová made her senior national team debut at the 2021 IIHF Women's World Championship. Several months later, she was the Czech Republic's second highest scoring defenceman in the Olympic qualification for the women's ice hockey tournament at the 2022 Winter Olympics, at which the Czech Republic qualified to participate in the Olympic Games for the first time in team history.  As a junior player with the Czech national under-18 team, she participated in the IIHF Women's U18 World Championships in 2018, 2019, and served as team captain for the 2020 tournament.

References

External links
 
 
 Sára Čajanová at Hokej.cz 

2002 births
Living people
Brynäs IF Dam players
Czech expatriate ice hockey players in Sweden
Czech women's ice hockey defencemen
Ice hockey players at the 2022 Winter Olympics
Olympic ice hockey players of the Czech Republic
Sportspeople from Zlín